First Dates Ireland is the Irish version of the international reality television series First Dates.

Format
The programme is filmed at The Gibson Hotel on Mayor Street in the Point Village in Dublin City, with Mateo Saina showing many people on dates, all of whom have not met each other before. At the end of the date, the couples are interviewed together and asked whether they would like to see each other again.

Restaurant staff
The restaurant's maitre d' is Croatian born and Dublin resident Mateo Saina who offers pieces to camera on the nature of love, romance and dating. Joining Mateo is his team of merry matchmakers; barman Ethan Miles and waitress Alice Marr, who will help set the scene and give romance the best possible chance to flourish.

Renewal
Due to its success the series was renewed for a third season of 14 episodes which broadcast in 2018. On series 6   Shez and Carla were the first couple to get engaged and have set a date for the wedding. The eighth season is currently showing on RTE 2.

References

External links

2016 Irish television series debuts
Dating and relationship reality television series
English-language television shows
Irish reality television series
Television series by Warner Bros. Television Studios